Chionopsis gnidia, is a species of medium-sized saltwater clam, a marine bivalve mollusc in the family Veneridae, the venus clams.

References

Veneridae
Bivalves described in 1829